CNL Center City Commons is a complex of buildings in Downtown Orlando. The main building is a 250 foot tall skyscraper that is the headquarters of CNLBank, Alliance Bankshares before being acquired by the founder of CNL Financial Group.  In 2010, its assessed value was $59.6 million.

The complex is also home to Orlando's current city hall, which was built after in the old one was demolished in the same area. The demolition was used in the movie Lethal Weapon 3.

References 

Skyscraper office buildings in Orlando, Florida
1999 establishments in Florida
Office buildings completed in 1999